Tiorga Mor (679 m) is a mountain in Harris, in the Outer Hebrides of Scotland.

The most westerly peak of the high mountains of Harris, it is a very rugged peak that provides superb views from its summit.

References

Mountains and hills of the Outer Hebrides
Marilyns of Scotland
Grahams
Landforms of the Outer Hebrides
Harris, Outer Hebrides